E Street is the fifth of a sequence of alphabetical streets in many cities.  

It may refer to:
E Street (TV series), an Australian television soap opera

Washington DC:
E Street Expressway
The E Street Band, known for their long association with Bruce Springsteen, named after E St, Belmar, New Jersey.
Bayfront/E Street station, known also as E Street, trolley station in San Diego, California